Erica Johnson is a Canadian broadcast journalist who currently hosts the TV series Go Public, and formerly hosted Marketplace on CBC Television.

Johnson was born in Vancouver, British Columbia. A graduate of Ryerson Polytechnical Institute (now Toronto Metropolitan University) in Toronto, Johnson began her journalism career in radio in 1987, working at several private radio stations, including Vancouver's CKO and Toronto's CFRB. In 1990, she began her CBC career as a radio news reporter for the local Toronto affiliate CBL.

Johnson moved from radio to CBC Television in 1993, creating and reporting on The Health Show. She then returned to Vancouver to become a news reporter and anchor for the Vancouver affiliate CBUT. Her specialty areas included media and health reporting, with a particular interest in the pharmaceutical industry.

Johnson joined Marketplace as a reporter, and eventually became the Vancouver co-host of the program alongside Wendy Mesley in Toronto.

Johnson has won numerous awards, including several Jack Webster Awards, RTNDA Awards, a Gabriel, a Freddie Award and a 2011 Leo Award for best host of an information series. She has also been nominated for four Gemini awards as Best Host or Interviewer in a News/Information Program, as well as Canadian Screen Awards for Best News or Information Segment at the 4th Canadian Screen Awards and Best National News Reporter at the 7th Canadian Screen Awards.

References

External links 
Erica Johnson's biography from CBC

1964 births
Living people
Canadian television news anchors
Canadian television reporters and correspondents
Canadian women television journalists
Jack Webster award recipients